Dylan Lucas (born 9 July 2000) is an Australian professional rugby league footballer who currently plays for the Newcastle Knights in the National Rugby League.

Background
Born in Bega, New South Wales, Lucas is of Indigenous Australian descent. He played his junior rugby league for the Albion Park Eagles, before being signed by the Illawarra Steelers.

Playing career

Early years
Lucas played for the Illawarra Steelers' Harold Matthews Cup team in 2016 and S. G. Ball Cup side in 2018. In 2019, he joined the Newcastle Knights and played for their Jersey Flegg Cup team. In 2021, he graduated to their NSW Cup team. In 2022, he played in an NRL trial match for the Knights against the Canterbury-Bankstown Bulldogs.

2023
In 2023, Lucas was upgraded to the Knights' top 30 NRL squad on a contract until the end of 2023. In round 3 of the 2022 NRL season, he made his NRL debut for the Knights against the Dolphins.

References

External links
Newcastle Knights profile

2000 births
Australian rugby league players
Indigenous Australian rugby league players
Newcastle Knights players
South Newcastle Lions players
Rugby league centres
Rugby league second-rows
Rugby league players from Bega, New South Wales
Living people